Turnera diffusa, known as damiana, is a shrub native to southern Texas in the United States, Central America, Mexico, South America, and the Caribbean. It belongs to the family Passifloraceae.

Damiana is a relatively small, woody shrub that produces small, aromatic flowers. It blossoms in early to late summer and is followed by fruits that taste similar to figs. The shrub is said to have a strong spice-like odor somewhat like chamomile, due to the aromatic compounds present in the plant.

Uses

Damiana is an ingredient in a traditional Mexican liqueur, which is sometimes used in lieu of triple sec in margaritas. Mexican folklore claims that it was used in the "original" margarita. The damiana margarita is popular in the Los Cabos region of Mexico. 

Damiana was included in several 19th-century patent medicines, such as Pemberton's French Wine Coca. The leaves were omitted from that product's non-alcoholic counterpart, Coca-Cola. In folklore, the plant was believed to be an aphrodisiac, hence its sometimes used binomial synonym, Turnera aphrodisiaca.

Phytochemistry
Damiana contains damianin; tetraphyllin B; gonzalitosin I; arbutin; tricosan-2-one; acacetin; p-cymene; β-sitosterol; 1,8-cineole; apigenin; α-pinene; β-carotene; β-pinene; tannins; thymol; and hexacosanol. In total, 22 flavonoids, maltol glucoside, phenolics, seven cyanogenic glycosides, monoterpenoids, sesquiterpenoids, triterpenoids, the polyterpene ficaprenol-11, fatty acids, and caffeine have been found in the genus Turnera. As of 2006, damiana's constituents have not been identified for their effects attributed to the whole herb. Damiana's anxiolytic properties might be due to apigenin. The extract from damiana has been found to suppress aromatase activity, including the isolated compounds pinocembrin and acacetin.

Ecology
T. diffusa is a host plant for the Mexican fritillary (Euptoieta hegesia), a butterfly.

Misidentification in commerce 
Viable plant and seed material sold as T. diffusa from both private and commercial sources largely turns out to be misidentified Turnera ulmifolia (a.k.a. "False Damiana"), a closely related species. This widespread issue has been noted by the scientific community, and has created much confusion among both amateur and professional horticulturists alike. While T. ulmifolia is similar in appearance, its chemical constituents and ethnobotanical uses are distinctly different. Mature stems of T. diffusa are woody, with small, grayed green leaves 13 to 16 mm long, 4.5 to 5.5 mm wide, obtuse at the apex, and strongly aromatic when crushed. T. ulmifolia is differentiated by herbaceous stems, larger blue-green leaves that are strongly dentate with a pointed apex, and only weakly aromatic. One scientific study however, demonstrated this confusion being mostly associated with horticultural commerce, and does not extend appreciably to commercial herbal products, most of which exhibit constituents that can be definitively traced to T. diffusa.

References

External links

Damiana vault at Erowid
Damiana (www.rain-tree.com) 

diffusa
Plants described in 1820
Liqueurs
Flora of South America
Flora of Mexico
Flora of Texas
Mexican alcoholic drinks